SACYR S.A. is a Spanish infrastructure operator and developer company based in Madrid.

History
The company was founded in 1986 as Sociedad Anónima Caminos y Regadíos and was renamed Sacyr in 1991. The company received their first concession in 1996, which was the Chilean El Elquí highway. From this moment on, it began its expansion by adding concessions in Chile and Spain and making purchases such as that of Avasa, the highway between Bilbao and Zaragoza.

In 2002, it acquired 24.5% of Vallehermoso, a leading Spanish housing business founded in 1921. In 2003 it merged with Vallehermoso to form Sacyr Vallehermoso.

In June 2006, Isolux Corsán presented a takeover bid for Europistas at a price of 4.8 euros per share, which meant valuing the company at 646 million euros.

On December 1, 2008, an agreement between the Citigroup fund and Sacyr was announced, whereby Sacyr disposed of its subsidiary for €7,887 million, €2,874 million in cash plus €5,013 million in net debt that would be assumed by the fund. The agreement did not include concessions under development and concessions in operation that were not highways. In addition, the group would later acquire from Citigroup a series of toll roads worth €478.3 million and a series of concession activities in the launch and construction phase for a total amount of €450 million. Sacyr seeks to bring together all the concessions it holds in a new subsidiary, Sacyr Concesiones. Abertis also agreed with Citigroup to buy assets in Spain and Chile for a value of €621 million. Also, Atlantia would acquire stakes in toll roads in Portugal, Brazil and Chile for €420 million.

Major projects
Major projects involving the business include the Torre Sacyr Vallehermoso, completed in 2008.

Shareholdings
Sacyr was the largest shareholder in the Spanish oil company Repsol YPF, holding an approximate 20% stake. On December 20, 2011, Repsol YPF bought half of Sacyr's stake back in order to save the shares from being seized in a foreclosure. As of June 2021, SACYR owned 7.8% of Repsol YPF.

References

External links
 

Construction and civil engineering companies of Spain
Companies based in Madrid
Spanish companies established in 1999
Multinational companies headquartered in Spain
Spanish brands
Companies listed on the Madrid Stock Exchange
Construction and civil engineering companies established in 1999